The following is a list of the 29 cantons of the Saône-et-Loire department, in France, following the French canton reorganisation which came into effect in March 2015:

 Autun-1
 Autun-2
 Blanzy
 Chagny
 Chalon-sur-Saône-1
 Chalon-sur-Saône-2
 Chalon-sur-Saône-3
 La Chapelle-de-Guinchay
 Charolles
 Chauffailles
 Cluny
 Le Creusot-1
 Le Creusot-2
 Cuiseaux
 Digoin
 Gergy
 Givry
 Gueugnon
 Hurigny
 Louhans
 Mâcon-1
 Mâcon-2
 Montceau-les-Mines
 Ouroux-sur-Saône
 Paray-le-Monial
 Pierre-de-Bresse
 Saint-Rémy
 Saint-Vallier
 Tournus

References